The 5th government of Turkey (1 November 1927 – 27 September 1930) was a government in the history of Turkey. It is also called the fourth İnönü government

Background 
The government was formed after Kemal Atatürk was elected as the president of Turkey for the second time. The prime minister was İsmet İnönü of the Republican People's Party (CHP), who was also the prime minister of the previous government.

The government
In the list below, the cabinet members who served only a part of the cabinet's lifespan are shown in the column "Notes".

In 1927–1930, surnames were not yet in use in Turkey, which would remain true until the Surname Law. The surnames given in the list are the surnames the members of the cabinet assumed later.

Aftermath
On 12 August, President Mustafa Kemal Atatürk asked Fethi Okyar, a former prime minister (3rd government of Turkey), to form an opposition party, the Liberal Republican Party, in order to try to jump-start multi-party democracy in Turkey for the second time. Due to the Great Depression, the government was losing support to the new party, and İnönü tried to regain strength by forming a new government.

References

05
Republican People's Party (Turkey) politicians
1927 establishments in Turkey
1930 disestablishments in Turkey
Cabinets established in 1927
Cabinets disestablished in 1930
Members of the 5th government of Turkey
3rd parliament of Turkey
Republican People's Party (Turkey)